Adidas Power Soccer 98  is a sports video game developed by Shen, published by Psygnosis, and sponsored by German sportswear company Adidas. It was released for PlayStation and Microsoft Windows in 1998.

Reception

The PlayStation version received unfavorable reviews according to the review aggregation website GameRankings.

References

External links
 

1998 video games
Adidas
Association football video games
PlayStation (console) games
Psygnosis games
Shen Technologies SARL games
Video games developed in France
Video games set in 1998
Windows games